The Call of Home is a 1922 American silent drama film directed by Louis J. Gasnier and starring Léon Bary, Irene Rich and Ramsey Wallace.

Cast
 Léon Bary as 	Alan Wayne 
 Irene Rich as 	Alix Lansing
 Ramsey Wallace as	Gerry Lansing
 Margaret Mann as 	Gerry's Mother
 Jobyna Ralston as 	Clem
 Genevieve Blinn as Nancy Wayne
 Wadsworth Harris as 	Captain Wayne
 James O. Barrows as Butler
 Carl Stockdale as 	Kemp
 Emmett King as Lieber
 Norma Nichols as 	Margarita
 Sidney Franklin as Priest
 Harry Lonsdale as Consul
 Barbara Maier as 	Little Girl

References

Bibliography
 Connelly, Robert B. The Silents: Silent Feature Films, 1910-36, Volume 40, Issue 2. December Press, 1998.
 Munden, Kenneth White. The American Film Institute Catalog of Motion Pictures Produced in the United States, Part 1. University of California Press, 1997.

External links
 

1922 films
1922 drama films
1920s English-language films
American silent feature films
Silent American drama films
American black-and-white films
Films directed by Louis J. Gasnier
Film Booking Offices of America films
1920s American films